Santa Teresa di Riva is a small town and comune in the Metropolitan City of Messina, Sicily, southern Italy, located about  from Taormina.  The town was known until 1854 as Marina di Savoca when it was renamed in honor of Teresa d'Austria.  The town is neighbored to the northeast by the towns of Furci Siculo and Roccalumera, to the west by Savoca, and to the southwest by Sant'Alessio Siculo and the mountainous Forza d'Agrò.

Culture
On the first weekend of every August, the Festa della Madonna is held, celebrating Maria di Porto Salvo.  On Saturday night, a statue of the Madonna is carried out from the church to the sea.  She is placed on a boat and many town residents sail with her on their own boats.  On Sunday, the Madonna is paraded around town, followed in a procession by a band and many of the town's residents.  During the Festa weekend, via F. Crispi (on which the church is located) is blocked off from traffic and decorated. At the end of the night on Sunday, fireworks are performed.

People
 Piero Carnabuci (1893–1958)

External links
 Official website

Municipalities of the Metropolitan City of Messina